Graham Hedman (born 6 February 1979 in Witham, Essex) is a British sprinter. At the 2006 European Athletics Championships in Gothenburg, he won the silver medal in the 4x400 m relay along with Robert Tobin, Rhys Williams and Timothy Benjamin, in a time of 3:01.63.

In 2010 he was part of the relay squad who won silver at the European Championships in Barcelona, and bronze at the Commonwealth Games in Delhi.

Personal bests
100 m – 10.64 sec (2004) (10.45w 2004)
200 m – 21.02 (2004) (21.01w 2010)
400 m – 45.84 (2006)

References 

1979 births
Living people
Sportspeople from Essex
People from Witham
English male sprinters
British male sprinters
Black British sportspeople
Commonwealth Games medallists in athletics
Athletes (track and field) at the 2010 Commonwealth Games
World Athletics Championships athletes for Great Britain
European Athletics Championships medalists
Commonwealth Games bronze medallists for England
Medallists at the 2010 Commonwealth Games